Urasterella is an extinct genus of sea stars that lived from the Ordovician to the Devonian.  Its fossils are known from Europe, North America and southern Africa.

Species
There have been a number of species assigned or transferred to the genus since its description in 1851.

U. asperrimus
U. asperula (syn. Protasteracanthion primus)
U. biradialis (syn. Salteraster biradialis) 
U. constellata
U. coronella (syn. Salteraster coronella) 
U. creswelli
U. grandis
U. gutterfordensis
U. huxleyi
U. imbricatus (syn. Salteraster imbricatus) 
U. montana
U. pulchella
U. ruthveni
U. selwyni (syn. Salteraster selwyni) 
U. thraivensis
U. ulrichi

Sources 

Urasterella (syn. Roemeraster) in the Field Museum's Evolving Planet

Platyasterida
Prehistoric starfish genera
Devonian animals
Prehistoric animals of Europe
Darriwilian first appearances
Middle Devonian genus extinctions
Paleozoic life of Ontario